Koryakinskaya is a rural locality (a village) in Tiginskoye Rural Settlement, Vozhegodsky District, Vologda Oblast, Russia. The population was 25 as of 2002.

Geography 
Koryakinskaya is located 51 km northwest of Vozhega (the district's administrative centre) by road. Grishkovskaya is the nearest rural locality.

References 

Rural localities in Vozhegodsky District